The Moose House is a historic house at 711 Green Street in Morrilton, Arkansas.  It is a 2½-story wood-frame structure with a gabled roof and weatherboard siding. A two-story gabled porch projects from the center bay, supported by paired square columns. The house was built around 1832 in Lewisburg on the Arkansas river and known as the Markham Tavern. It was moved to its current location after the Civil War by James Miles Moose, one of the two founders (along with Edward Morrill) of Morrilton. The area where this house was built was  farmland until the 1880s, when the railroad arrived in the area, prompting the two men to lobby for a railroad station, around which the town grew.

The house was listed on the National Register of Historic Places in 1974.

See also
National Register of Historic Places listings in Conway County, Arkansas

References

Houses on the National Register of Historic Places in Arkansas
Houses in Conway County, Arkansas
Buildings and structures in Morrilton, Arkansas
1860s establishments in Arkansas
Houses completed in the 19th century